Kingdom Under Fire: Heroes is an action strategy game, the prequel to Kingdom Under Fire: The Crusaders, released in 2005 for the Xbox.

Gameplay
Both games deal with commanding large armies in epic, magical battles. When the commanding unit enters a battle, the player can control the hero. Each group or army consists of 20 to 30 soldiers, but the player is limited to only five armies and a support unit per game. A support unit, or a special unit, is an army whose main attack does not rely on the race that you control (Humans, Orcs, Dark Elves) but instead on technology for the humans and magical creatures for the Orcs and Dark Elves. Support units are directed and used as powers instead of regular army units and besides the Swamp Mammoth, all support units fly.

Besides a new storyline, commanders, and game type, there are also four new units that look like support units, but act as regular ones. The Fire Wraiths, Ice Maidens, Thunder Rhino, and Earth Golem use their respective elements to destroy enemy forces quickly.

In Heroes the player has access to seven new heroes, all of whom were in Crusaders: Ellen (half-elf), Leinhart (half-vampire), Urukubarr (ogre), Rupert (human), Cirith (dark-elf), Morene (half-vampire), and Walter (human).

Each character has their own campaign which determines the time period of gameplay. When playing as Ellen, Leinhart, or Urukubarr, the game takes place five years before Crusaders. As Morene, Cirith, Rupert, or Walter, the game takes place during Crusaders.

Plot

Reception
Computer and Video Games gave the game a score of 90/100 calling Heroes an awe inspiring game. The game was generally well received by professional reviewers. Edge reviewed Heroes in issue 155, awarding 7 out of 10. The main criticisms were that some troop types are still unable to flourish during situations when they should, some AI glitches and inconsistencies, and it feels more like a set of tweaks and fixes than a fully honed sequel. However, it was still recognised as a stirring, challenging experience which rewards a player for using levelheaded, adaptive tactics. The chaotic, brutal melee combat and support for online play was also highlighted

References

External links 
 Official site

2005 video games
Crowd-combat fighting games
Hack and slash games
Interquel video games
Microsoft games
Real-time tactics video games
Video games about vampires
Video game prequels
Video games developed in South Korea
Video games featuring female protagonists
Video games set in China
Xbox games
Multiplayer and single-player video games
Deep Silver games
Phantagram games
Blueside games